Brother Power the Geek is a comic book character created in the late 1960s for DC Comics by Joe Simon. He first appeared in Brother Power the Geek #1 (October 1968).

The concept behind Brother Power was derived heavily from Mary Shelley's Frankenstein right down to reanimation with the use of lightning. At the same time, Simon was also attempting to capture the sort of "wandering outcast philosopher" characterization that made Marvel Comics' Silver Surfer a cult hit among the college student readers of the period.

According to Scott Shaw, the character was originally supposed to be called The Freak, but was renamed to The Geek due to concerns by DC Comics management over the possible drug reference "freak" implied at the time.

Original appearance
The original series lasted only two issues. Brother Power was originally a mannequin abandoned in an empty tailor's shop. The shop was taken over by hippies Nick Cranston and Paul Cymbalist, who dressed up the dummy in Paul's wet and bloodied "hip threads" to keep them from shrinking, having been attacked by Hound Dawg and other war hawks. Forgotten for months, but eventually struck by lightning, Brother Power was brought to life and endowed with super power and speed.

Shortly after his creation, Brother Power was kidnapped by the "Psychedelic Circus". The freaks in the Freakshow at the "Psychedelic Circus" were all based on the styles of "Big Daddy" Ed Roth and Harvey Kurtzman, both of whom were good friends of Simon. After escaping, he was fixed up and given a face by another hippie named Cindy, and attempted to run for the United States Congress. His misadventures with the establishment led to finding work and encouraging other hippies to do so, eventually getting hired by the J.P. Acme Corporation just as it was taken over by the wicked Lord Sliderule. Brother Power's ingenuity still made the assembly line run more efficiently. Brother Power was last seen being shot into space on orders from Governor Ronald Reagan, after trying to prevent the sabotage of a rocket launch by Hound Dawg and his gang, knowing it would be blamed on hippies.

While sales of the title were modest, Brother Power was not popular among the staff.  Former DC Comics Editorial Director Carmine Infantino claimed in several interviews following his retirement from comics that Superman editor Mort Weisinger disliked the character very strongly, and petitioned DC publisher Jack Liebowitz to shut down the title. According to Infantino, Weisinger harbored an admitted dislike for the hippie subculture of the 1960s, and felt that Simon portrayed them too sympathetically. It did not help that Hound Dawg and his cronies appeared with uniforms and gadgetry evocative of Nazis in the second issue. According to Joe Simon, the third issue was canceled just before the finished artwork was to be set up for print duplication, and Simon would neither discuss the plot of this issue nor release any of the original art.

Despite Weisinger's concerns over the hippie subculture and the level of drug abuse it represented, drug, substance and alcohol intake are not depicted.

Simon was not the artist on the title's two issues. The artwork was by Al Bare, who had been working with Simon at Sick. Simon had hired Bare to "ghost" the art, and was subsequently credited with the art.

Later appearances
The character was revived briefly two decades later, first in a short story by Neil Gaiman in Swamp Thing Annual #5 (1989) (reprinted in Neil Gaiman's Midnight Days), and then in a Vertigo one-shot by Rachel Pollack and Mike Allred titled Vertigo Visions - The Geek.

In Gaiman's story, Brother Power is revealed to be an imperfect elemental, similar to the Swamp Thing, and he is connected to all human simulacra such as dolls, dummies, statues, etc. The story resumes with the rocket's return to earth, guided into Tampa Bay by Firestorm after an unsuccessful attempt to destroy it. His newfound ability to change his size at will leads to a call to Batman, who defers to Abigail Cable.  Ultimately, an aging hippie named Chester is able to calm him down.

Pollack's story featured a brief return of Brother Power's adversary, Lord Sliderule, now in a business suit, and depicted Brother Power being forced to perform as a circus geek, eating live animals for the first time. Eventually, after more misadventures with the establishment, he is reunited with Cindy (the hippie who had given him his face), now a prostitute, and is destroyed in his original form while saving her life; however, he ultimately survives by possessing one of her dolls.

In one issue of the crossover miniseries Legends, a marquee in the background reads Brother Power the Geek: The Movie. He is also among the superheroes briefly summoned by Snapper Carr in the Blasters Special.

In Grant Morrison's Animal Man, Brother Power is mentioned several times as someone who escaped from comic book limbo, in spite of other limbo dwellers' expectations, and his name appears in graffiti. He also appeared briefly in Tom Peyer's Totems, as a guest at John Constantine's 1999 New Year's Eve party.

Brother Power made a return appearance in The Brave and the Bold vol. 3 #29 (January 2010). This issue presents Cindy as having been a doctor at a free clinic, but after some tragedy, having opened a toy store that was burned before the story begins. The story also casts doubt over Brother Power's true origin, as conflicting urban legends are mentioned, some stating that Brother Power is a reanimated dummy and others saying he is an elemental. In addition, it is also established, retroactively, that the events of the original series had taken place in Gotham City, although they had previously been explicitly set in San Francisco, with "the governor" clearly drawn as Reagan. After awakening in 2009, Brother Power wanders aimlessly through the streets of Gotham, until he stumbles upon a burning building where several innocent people have been left tied up and gagged inside. Though Batman tries to convince Power to abandon the building and let him take care of the victims, he refuses, remarking that he does not belong in the modern world. The issue ends with the dazed and badly-injured Brother Power staggering through the sewers, where he eventually collapses. In the closing narration, Batman finds comfort in the idea that Brother Power will one day reawaken in a time when values have prevailed that are closer to his own.

The character played a role in the 6-Issue limited series Inferior Five as a guidance voice in Peacemaker’s helmet as a way for him to get more notoriety by a team-up. Unfortunately, this plan failed as the series ended on 6 issues which caused him to mope about how his plan could have worked.

Alternate versions
 An alternate-universe human-like version of Brother Power the Geek appeared in the Elseworlds mini-series Conjurors.
 In the 1997 Tangent Comics title The Joker, there was a human character who called himself "Brother Power", but whom the Joker called "The Geek".
 In Kingdom Come by Mark Waid and Alex Ross, Brother Power appears in the back of a metahuman bar with Rorschach breaking his finger.
 A version of the character appears in Planetary #7, where it appeared at the funeral of a man named Jack Carter, who bore a strong resemblance to John Constantine.
 Brother Power the Geek makes an appearance in Batman: The Brave and the Bold #15. He appears in the beginning assisting Batman and Super-Hip in stopping the Mad Mod by telling the clothes to stop attacking people.
 In the Multiversity Guidebook (January 2015), Brother Power is mentioned as a member of the Love Syndicate of Dreamworld on the countercultural, psychedelic Earth-47.
 Brother Power appears in Scooby-Doo! Team-Up, #67-68. He was initially thought to be a monster and was investigated by Mystery Inc but was befriended by Shaggy due to their mutual taste for hippy culture.

In other media

Television
 The Batman: The Brave and the Bold episode "Time Out For Vengeance!" features a brief scene where Guy Gardner is shown reading an issue of Brother Power the Geek while relaxing on the Justice League Satellite.

 In Young Justice: Outsiders episode "Away Mission", Jaime Reyes is reading an issue of Brother Power the Geek with Traci Thurston and Bart Allen in his bedroom.

References

External links

Further reading
 

1968 comics debuts
Characters created by Joe Simon
Comics characters introduced in 1968
DC Comics characters with superhuman strength
DC Comics male characters
Fictional dolls and dummies
Fictional puppets
Vertigo Comics titles